Nina Golovtchenko is a Russian curler and two-time Russian women's champion (1999, 2001).

She was the skip of the Russian national women's team in the team's first appearance at the 2001 World Women's Curling Championship.

Teams

Women's

References

External links

Living people
Russian female curlers
Russian curling champions
Year of birth missing (living people)